The 1928 Detroit Stars baseball team competed in the Negro National League during the 1928 baseball season. The team lost to the St. Louis Stars in the race for the Negro National League pennant. In games for which newspaper accounts have been found, the team compiled a 52–26 record.

The Stars played their home games at Mack Park in Detroit. The team was owned by John A. Roesink and led by player-manager Bingo DeMoss. The Stars led the Negro National League in attendance.

On the field, the team was led by several players: 
 Center fielder Turkey Stearnes compiled a .322 batting average and a .640 slugging percentage in 82 games. He also led the Negro National League with a career-high 24 home runs. In 2000, Stearnes was posthumously inducted into the Baseball Hall of Fame.
 First baseman Ed Rile compiled a .350 batting average and .513 slugging percentage.
 Third baseman Claude Johnson compiled a .329 batting average and .401 on-base percentage.
 Right fielder Cristóbal Torriente, a 35-year-old veteran from Cuba, compiled a .322 batting average. In addition to playing in the outfield, Torriente also appeared in 14 games as a pitcher, compiling a 6-2 record. He was posthumously inducted into the Baseball Hall of Fame in 2006.
 George Mitchell led the pitching staff with a 13–9 win–loss record with 57 strikeouts in 151-2/3 innings pitched.

Roster

Game log

References

1928 in sports in Michigan
Negro league baseball seasons
African-American history in Detroit